Holt Nunatak is a prominent nunatak lying at the northeast corner of Larsen Inlet in Graham Land, Antarctica. It was mapped from surveys by the Falkland Islands Dependencies Survey (1960–61), and was named by the UK Antarctic Place-Names Committee after the Holt Manufacturing Company of Stockton, California, which began commercial production of chain-track tractors in 1906, and the Holt Caterpillar Tractor Company of New York City, founded two years later.

References

Nunataks of Graham Land
Nordenskjöld Coast